Laatu is an  Indian-Punjabi-language period drama film directed by Manav Shah and co-produced by Farid Entertainment and New Era Movies. The film stars Gagan Kokri, Aditi Sharma, Anita Devgn, Sardar Sohi, Hardeep Gill and Karamjit Anmol in pivotal roles. The film released on 16 November 2018 in India. Also, the film marks as debut for singer Gagan Kokri as an actor.

Cast 

 Gagan Kokri
 Aditi Sharma
 Karamjit Anmol
 Anita Devgan
 Sardar Sohi
 Ashish Duggal
 Hardeep Gill
 Harby Sangha
 Rahul Jungral
 Nisha Bano
 Prince Kanwaljit Singh
 Parkash Gadhu
 Malkit Rauni

References 

Punjabi-language Indian films
2010s Punjabi-language films
Indian drama films

Films scored by Jatinder Shah